West Eyreton is a small rural village in the Canterbury region of New Zealand's South Island. It is west of Kaiapoi and north-west of Eyreton and is named after Edward John Eyre, a 19th-century lieutenant governor of the South Island, then known as New Munster. In the 2001 New Zealand census the population was 1,146 (573 males and 573 females), an increase of 306 or 36.4% since the 1996 census.

In the 1870s, poor transport led to the construction of the Eyreton Branch railway line, which opened on 17 December 1875. Despite its name it ran to the north of Eyreton and originally terminated in West Eyreton, extended to Bennetts Junction on the Oxford Branch on 1 February 1878. Beyond Horrelville closed on 9 February 1931, and on 26 May 1954 low traffic led to the closure of the branch. Little remains besides some of the formation and a loading bank at the site of station.

Demographics

West Eyreton had a population of 1,464 at the 2018 New Zealand census, an increase of 90 people (6.6%) since the 2013 census, and an increase of 363 people (33.0%) since the 2006 census. There were 507 households. There were 753 males and 711 females, giving a sex ratio of 1.06 males per female. The median age was 45 years (compared with 37.4 years nationally), with 300 people (20.5%) aged under 15 years, 210 (14.3%) aged 15 to 29, 756 (51.6%) aged 30 to 64, and 195 (13.3%) aged 65 or older.

Ethnicities were 94.7% European/Pākehā, 5.7% Māori, 0.6% Pacific peoples, 3.7% Asian, and 1.8% other ethnicities (totals add to more than 100% since people could identify with multiple ethnicities).

The proportion of people born overseas was 16.8%, compared with 27.1% nationally.

Although some people objected to giving their religion, 52.3% had no religion, 36.7% were Christian, 0.2% were Hindu, 0.2% were Buddhist and 2.5% had other religions.

Of those at least 15 years old, 216 (18.6%) people had a bachelor or higher degree, and 180 (15.5%) people had no formal qualifications. The median income was $40,200, compared with $31,800 nationally. The employment status of those at least 15 was that 642 (55.2%) people were employed full-time, 216 (18.6%) were part-time, and 24 (2.1%) were unemployed.

Education
West Eyreton School is West Eyreton's only school. It is a  state coeducational full primary school with a decile rating of 10 and a roll of  students (as of

References

External links 
2001 census data and community profile
West Eyreton School homepage - has a history page about the school and community.

Waimakariri District
Populated places in Canterbury, New Zealand